The Employee is a 1959 Italian  comedy film directed by Gianni Puccini. The film is loosely inspired by The Secret Life of Walter Mitty.

Cast 
 Nino Manfredi as Nando 
 Eleonora Rossi Drago as Inspector Jacobetti 
 Anna Maria Ferrero as  Joan 
 Gianrico Tedeschi as  Director 
 Andrea Checchi as  Francesco 
 Anna Campori as  Lisetta 
 Sergio Fantoni as  Sergio Jacobetti 
 Gianni Bonagura as Pipetto 
 Arturo Bragaglia as Nando's Father
 Pietro De Vico as  McNally 
 Cesare Polacco as Inspector Rock 
 Franco Giacobini as Rotondi 
 Polidor 
 Enrico Glori    
 Ignazio Leone
Gianni Minervini as a gangster

References

External links

1959 films
Commedia all'italiana
Films directed by Gianni Puccini
Films set in Rome
Films shot in Rome
1959 comedy films
1950s Italian films